The White Hope is a 1915 British silent sports film directed by Frank Wilson and starring Stewart Rome, Violet Hopson and Lionelle Howard. It is set in the world of boxing.

Cast
 Stewart Rome as Jack Delane  
 Violet Hopson as Claudia Carisbrooke  
 Lionelle Howard as Durward Carisbrooke  
 John MacAndrews as Shannon  
 Frank Wilson as Royce  
 George Gunther as Sam Crowfoot 
 Chrissie White

References

Bibliography
 Palmer, Scott. British Film Actors' Credits, 1895-1987. McFarland, 1988.

External links

1915 films
British boxing films
1910s sports films
British silent feature films
Films directed by Frank Wilson
Films based on British novels
British black-and-white films
1910s English-language films
1910s British films
Silent sports films